San Ramón is one of two main towns in the Chanchamayo Province of the Junín Region, on the eastern slopes of the Andean Cordillera Oriental in Peru.

Geography

A nearby attraction in the jungle is the Terol Waterfall.

West of the city, is the Toro Huajrashga Mountain.

Overview
The city has a population of circa 30,0000 inhabitants. It has a warm, humid tropical climate, with most of the precipitation occurs from December to March. An airport with small airplanes serves the Central Jungle of Peru.

References

External links

Populated places in the Junín Region